The third and final series of the British crime drama Broadchurch began airing on the ITV broadcast network in the United Kingdom on 27 February 2017 and is set three years after the events of series two. The eight-episode series follows the rape of a local woman in the fictional, close-knit coastal town of Broadchurch in Dorset, England. The return features series stars David Tennant and Olivia Colman and many other actors from the first two series.

Production

Production approval
While conceiving and writing the first series of Broadchurch in 2012, Chris Chibnall designed his story to be told as a trilogy but, of course, the first series had to be self-contained in case the show did not do well in the ratings and a second series was not commissioned. When he pitched series one to ITV, in the autumn of 2012, he pitched series two and three at the same time.

On 1 December 2014, a number of media outlets reported that ITV had commissioned a third series of Broadchurch.

On 23 February 2015, ITV confirmed that Broadchurch, as well as David Tennant and Olivia Colman, would return for a third series, repeating the use of "Broadchurch will return" after the closing credits. Jane Featherstone and Chris Chibnall continued as executive producers of the programme in series three, with Dan Winch replacing Richard Stokes as producer for the final series. Chibnall is the lead writer.

Writing
Filming for the third series began in May 2016 and broadcast started on 27 February 2017. The final series follows Miller and Hardy as they investigate a serious sexual assault. Creator Chris Chibnall said, "We have one last story to tell, featuring both familiar faces and new characters. I hope it's a compelling and emotional farewell to a world and show that means so much to me." The Shores, Dorset’s Sexual Assault Referral Centre (SARC), and the Dorset Rape Crisis charity, along with various police advisers assisted Chibnall throughout writing the scripts.

Casting
David Tennant and Olivia Colman were the first two cast members to be confirmed to return for the third and final series. On 12 April 2016, ITV officially announced the casting for the third and final series, with Jodie Whittaker, Andrew Buchan, Arthur Darvill, Carolyn Pickles, and Adam Wilson returning to play their respective roles as Beth Latimer, Mark Latimer, Rev. Paul Coates, Maggie Radcliffe, and Tom Miller. Joe Sims confirmed his return as Nigel Carter via Twitter. Charlotte Rampling confirmed she will not return as Jocelyn Knight QC, with her character's absence explained in the second episode as being due to her being involved in a big trial in London.

New to Broadchuch include Mark Bazeley, Georgina Campbell, Julie Hesmondhalgh, Charlie Higson, Sarah Parish, Lenny Henry, Roy Hudd, Sunetra Sarker, Sebastian Armesto, Becky Brunning, Jim Howick, Chris Mason, and Deon-Lee Williams.

Cast

 Detective Inspector Alec Hardy (David Tennant) – returns to Broadchurch with his daughter and continues to work with DS Miller, having been away for a while.
 Detective Sergeant Ellie Miller (Olivia Colman) – working with DI Hardy in Broadchurch while rebuilding her life following her husband's acquittal.
 Trish Winterman (Julie Hesmondhalgh) – Leah's mother and Ian's estranged wife. Works for Ed Burnett. She is the rape victim.
 Cath Atwood (Sarah Parish) – Jim's wife. Trish's friend and colleague at the local farm shop.
 Jim Atwood (Mark Bazeley) – Cath's husband and owner of the local garage.
 Ian Winterman (Charlie Higson) – Leah's father and Trish's estranged husband. A teacher.
 Leah Winterman (Hannah Millward) – Trish and Ian Winterman's daughter.
 Ed Burnett (Lenny Henry) – owner of the local farm shop where Trish and Cath work.
 Detective Constable Katie Harford (Georgina Campbell) – new detective.
 Beth Latimer (Jodie Whittaker) – mother to Chloe, Lizzie, and murder victim Danny. Now working at “SARA” (which stands for “sexual assault response agency”).
 Mark Latimer (Andrew Buchan) – father to Chloe, Lizzie, and murder victim Danny. Separated from Beth and haunted by the injustice for his late son.
 Daisy Hardy (Hannah Rae) – DI Alec Hardy's 16-year-old daughter.
 Chloe Latimer (Charlotte Beaumont) – Beth and Mark's 18-year-old daughter.
 Elizabeth "Lizzie" Latimer (Emily Allison) – Beth and Mark's younger, infant daughter.
 David Barrett (Roy Hudd) – Ellie's father. After his wife's death, he moved in with his daughter and her family.
 Fred Miller (Benji Yapp) – younger son of DS Ellie Miller.
 Tom Miller (Adam Wilson) – 15-year-old elder son of DS Ellie Miller.
 Maggie Radcliffe (Carolyn Pickles) – editor of the Broadchurch Echo, the local newspaper.
 Caroline Hughes (Mariah Gale)  – Chief Executive at the media company that owns the Broadchurch Echo.
 Ben Haywood (William Andrews) – former junior barrister to QC Knight.
 Laura Benson (Kelly Gough) – rape victim two years earlier.
 Nigel "Nige" Carter (Joe Sims) – Mark Latimer's best friend and employee.
 Reverend Paul Coates (Arthur Darvill) – Anglican vicar in Broadchurch.
 Sahana Harrison (Sunetra Sarker) – Beth Latimer's boss at SARA.
 Leo Humphries (Chris Mason) – running his father's fishing supply business.
 Aaron Mayford (Jim Howick) – convicted rapist and sex offender recently released from prison.
 Arthur Tamworth (Richard Hope) – owner of Axehampton House, Cath's birthday party venue.
 Clive Lucas (Sebastian Armesto) – husband to Lindsay and stepfather to Michael. Private minicab driver. 
 Lindsay Lucas (Becky Brunning) – wife to Clive and mother to Michael.
 Michael Lucas (Deon Lee-Williams) – Lindsay's son and Tom Miller's friend.
 Sarah Elsey (Charlotte Lucas) – colleague and mistress to Ian Winterman.
 Joe Miller (Matthew Gravelle) – DS Ellie Miller's ex-husband; acquitted of Danny's murder.
 Chief Superintendent Clark (Josette Simon) - DS Ellie Miller's and DI Alec Hardy's superior.

Episodes

Reception

Awards
Broadchurch won the award for best Crime Drama at National Television Awards in early 2018. This was the first year the award was presented and Broadchurch was competing against Sherlock, Line of Duty and Little Boy Blue.

References

2017 British television seasons
Broadchurch